In Stereo EP is Cartel's second EP and fifth release.  The band released the recording independently after a recent departure from Wind-Up Records.

Track listing

Credits 
Will Pugh - Vocals
Kevin Sanders - Drums
Joseph Pepper - Guitar
Nic Hudson - Guitar

References

External links

In Stereo at MySpace (streamed copy where licensed)

2011 EPs
Cartel (band) albums